Frida Krifca (born March 20, 1978) is an Albanian politician who is currently serving as the Minister of Agliculture in the Rama III Cabinet since September 2021.

Early life 
Frida Krifca was born on March 20, 1978 in Tirana, Albania. She attended University of Tirana in Faculty of Economics. After graduating she went on to study at University of Akron in Ohio, United States as well as Harvard Business School.

Political career 
Krifca has a 22 years of experience in administration and management, with a special focus on the development of the financial sector the use of financial services and business development, meeting national, international and international economic, legal and structural objectives. In July 2017 Frida has been managing the Agency of Agriculture and Rural Development (ARDA). She is responsible for administering state budget support schemes of farmes ensuring transparency and guaranteeing control mechanisms in investments and direct payments, which under its leadership are transferred to on-line processes and with zero documents. Previously she worked for 4 years as a Director of Albanian for Financial Services Volunteer Corps (FSVC), an NGO headquartered in New York. Prior to joining FSVC, she worked for Tirana Bank as Director of Marketing and Public Relations, after several years of experience in the field of management and strategies at Agna Group. In September 2021, she was appointed Minister of Agriculture after Milva Ekonomi by the Prime Minister of Albania, Edi Rama for his new cabinet Rama III.

Personal life 
Frida Krifca is married and has two girls.

References

External links 
Frida Krifca at Instagram

Frida Krifca at Twitter

Living people
1978 births
Government ministers of Albania
Women government ministers of Albania